Colonial Theatre, also known as The Colonial Center for the Performing Arts, is a historic movie theater located at South Hill, Mecklenburg County, Virginia. It was built in 1925, and housed in a three-story, brick, commercial building.

It was listed on the National Register of Historic Places in 2003.

It is now mainly used for community theater productions and local events.

History 
First built in 1925, the Colonial Theatre was closed between 1970 and approximately 2001, when an effort was made to restore the building to its original state. The three story building now houses two lobbies and a welcome center on its main floor. The second story houses an art gallery and offices, which the third floor is home to a ball room which can be rented out for events, such as weddings. 

The theater itself seats 400. Tours of the building are available to the general public by appointment.

References

External links

The Colonial Center website

Theatres on the National Register of Historic Places in Virginia
Theatres completed in 1925
Buildings and structures in Mecklenburg County, Virginia
National Register of Historic Places in Mecklenburg County, Virginia